The Honourable Kate Ewart-Biggs OBE (born November 1967) is Deputy Chief Executive of the British Council.

Personal life
Her father was Christopher Ewart-Biggs a British diplomat who was killed by the IRA in Dublin in 1976. Her mother was Jane Randall. She studied social anthropology at Edinburgh University. She appeared on Desert Island Discs on 17 July 2022. She is married with a daughter.

Career with British Council
Kate joined the British Council after working help street children around the world in places such as Brazil, South Africa and Indonesia. She has been posted by the Council to Uganda, Tanzania, Central and Eastern Europe and in Egypt. She was Regional Head for the Middle East and North Africa. Before she was Deputy Chief Executive, she was Director Global Network and managed relationships with the British Government departments.

References

British Council
Alumni of the University of Edinburgh
Living people
Officers of the Order of the British Empire
Daughters of life peers
1967 births